Transport in Lithuania relies mainly on road and rail networks.

Lithuanian road system

(2018):
total:

paved:

unpaved:

Highways

Controlled-access highways sections 

There are two categories of controlled-access highways in Lithuania: expressways (Lithuanian: greitkeliai) with maximum speed 120 km/h and motorways (Lithuanian: automagistralės) with maximum speed 130 km/h.

Motorway sections 
 A1 Kaunas – Klaipėda. Total length of the stretch: 195 km. The motorway ends for a short section near Sujainiai (Raseiniai district municipality) as the junction here is one-level and it is used by non-motorway vehicles.
A2 Vilnius – Panevėžys. Total length of the stretch: 114 km.
A5 Kaunas – Marijampolė. Total length of the stretch: 57 km.
A1 Kaunas – Vilnius. There length of the stretch: 55 km (Kaunas – Vievis) and 16 km (Vievis – Grigiškės).

Expressway sections 

A9 Radviliškis – Šiauliai. Total length of the stretch: 10 km.

A road system
The A roads (Lithuanian: magistraliniai keliai) total . 

 A1 Vilnius – Kaunas – Klaipėda, . Most important east to west corridor in Lithuania. Connects three largest Lithuanian cities: Vilnius, Kaunas and Klaipėda. Most of the road has motorway status.
 A2 Vilnius – Panevėžys, . The stretch between Vilnius and Šilagalis has motorway status.
 A3 Vilnius – Medininkai Border Checkpoint, . Continues to Belarus and connects Vilnius with the Belarusian capital of Minsk.
 A4 Vilnius – Raigardas Border Checkpoint, . Continues to Grodno, Belarus.
 A5 Kaunas – border with Poland, . The stretch from Kaunas to Marijampolė has motorway status. Continues towards Suwałki in Poland.
 A6 Kaunas – Daugavpils, . Continues towards Daugavpils in Latvia.
 A7 Marijampolė – Kybartai Border Checkpoint, . An important transit route to Kaliningrad Oblast.
 A8 Sitkūnai – Panevėžys, . 
 A9 Panevėžys – Šiauliai, . Short 10 km expressway section.
 A10 Panevėžys – Bauska . Continues to Bauska in Latvia. Important transit route to Riga.
 A11 Šiauliai – Palanga, 
 A12 border with Latvia – Panemunė Border Checkpoint, 
 A13 Klaipėda – Liepaja, 
 A14 Vilnius – Utena, 
 A15 Vilnius – Lida, 
 A16 Vilnius – Marijampolė, 
 A17 Panevėžys Bypass, .
 A18 Šiauliai Bypass, 
 A19 Vilnius Southern Bypass, 
 A20 Ukmergė Northern Bypass, 
 A21 Panemunė Eastern Bypass, 4 km (2.5 mi)

Major highway projects in Interwar Lithuania 
Before World War I, there were few isolated routes suitable for transit traffic e.g. present-day A12 highway, connecting Riga with Kaliningrad, or present day A6 highway which was part of highway Warsaw-Saint Petersburg that ran through Kaunas. After Lithuania becoming an independent country in 1918, there was increased demand for new highways for inner needs. First long-distance highways built exclusively by Lithuanian Government were opened in late 1930s. These are following:
 Samogitian highway – old highway built in the course 1930s, connecting Kaunas and Klaipėda. Road section between Kaunas and Ariogala is now completely refurbished to motorway, and the road section from Ariogala to Klaipėda is serving as alternative road for a parallelly-built motorway A1 and connects local towns such as Ariogala, Raseiniai, Rietavas.
 Aukštaitian Highway – old highway built in the 1930s. It connects Kaunas, Kėdainiai, Panevėžys and Biržai to Riga. After building an original route, new routes were built through the course of Soviet Union and after its dissolution. The road was gradually rerouted to avoid larger urban areas, and now runs from Sitkūnai, bypasses Kėdainiai, Panevėžys, Pasvalys, Biržai, and reaches Latvian border to Riga. Rerouted highway now forms part of Via Baltica.

Museum 

 Lithuanian Road Museum

Railways 

There is a total of 1,998 route km of railways, of which:
1,807 km are broad gauge of  – 122 km of which are electrified
169 km are narrow gauge of  – as of 2001
22 km are standard gauge of

Rail links with adjacent countries 

 Latvia – yes
 Belarus – yes
 Russia (Kaliningrad) – yes
 Poland – yes – break-of-gauge  /

Waterways 
There are  that are perennially navigable.

Pipelines 

Ports and harbours

Sea ports

 Būtingė
 Klaipėda
 Šventoji

River ports
 Kaunas
 Rumšiškės
 Nida
 Juodkrantė

Merchant marine 
The merchant marine consists of 47 ships of 1,000 GT or over, together totaling 279,743 GT/.

Ships by type: 
Cargo 25, Combination bulk 8, Petroleum tanker 2, Railcar carrier 1, Refrigerated cargo 6, Roll on/roll off 2, Short-sea passenger 3.

Note: These totals include some foreign-owned ships registered here as a flag of convenience: Denmark 13 (2002 est.)

Airports 
In Lithuania, there are four international airports:
 Vilnius International Airport
 Kaunas Airport
 Palanga International Airport
 Šiauliai International Airport
 Paved Runways: 9 in total
over 3,047 m: 2
1,524 to 2,437 m: 4
under 914 m: 3
 Unpaved runways: 63 in total
2,438 to 3,047 m: 3
914 to 1,523 m: 5
under 914 m: 55

See also

External links 
 The public transport guide